Brahmapur is a neighbourhood of Kolkata in West Bengal, India. It is located in the southern fringes of the city and is flanked by Bansdroni to the north and west, Naktala to the east and Boral to the south.

Etymology
The name of the place can be located back to the glory days of the Brahmo Samaj and of Rishi Raj Narayan Bose, who was born in this area. He was a premier Brahmo Samaji and thus called his area 'Brahmopur' which gradually became 'Brahmapur'. The main arterial road of the locality is named after him.

History
Brahmapur is probably one of the few south Kolkata neighbourhoods untouched by the effects of the partition of India.

Brahmapur was untouched by the urban boom of Kolkata until the late 90s in spite being so close to the city. Accessibility and safety were major concerns. It was a gram panchayat initially and became part of the Jadavpur Municipality. Later it became part of the Kolkata Municipal Corporation after the merging of the Jadavpur Municipality with K.M.C. Now the locality has a post office and a Bank of Baroda Branch.

With the real estate boom of the late 90s, Suvada Housing, a real estate development concern, took fancy to this area and developed a number of low-cost apartment complexes in the locality naming them as Niva Parks with different Phases. With this a large number of people moved into the area, and of them a large chunk were South Indians.

Transport facilities improved with the opening up of auto routes and asphalting of the roads. Very recently since 2002, new medium & high cost apartments were set up by the Abason Parisad of Housing Dept., Govt of West Bengal, like the Shikhar Bindu Housing Co-operative and Jubilee Housing which are state of the art complexes.

Open spaces, unpolluted air and proximity to the high-growth locality of Bansdroni, Naktala, Garia, Tollygunge, Eastern Metropolitan Bypass and the upcoming extension of the Kolkata Metro to Garia has fuelled growth in the locality.

The influx of people continues and Brahmapur continues to thrive as one of the emerging lower middle-class suburbs of Kolkata.

Transport
Brahmapur, being a primarily rural locality, has very narrow and serpentine roads which are not suitable for bigger vehicles like buses, minibuses and thus, the major transport facilities used are the auto-rickshaws and cycle rickshaws & occasional taxi. But it is well connected by both to Garia and Bansdroni. The main entry points for the locality are Usha Gate bus-stop Naktala, Bansdroni Bazaar bus-stop on Netaji Subhash Chandra Bose Road and from Garia.

The Kolkata Metro connects Brahmapur via the Masterda Surya Sen metro station and Gitanjali metro station, which are of few distance from Brahmapur.

Medical Facilities
1. Udayan Nursing Home Bansdroni, Kolkata-40.

2. BRWS Hospital Garia.

3. Sparsh Diagnostic Centre

Educational institutions
 Niva Ananda Vidyalaya, Niva Park Phase III
 Naktala High School
 Holy Home
 Khanpur Boys High School
 Khanpur Grils High School

Places of interest
 Tripureshwari Temple at Garia Boral on the Brahmapur-Natunhat Road

References

External links

Neighbourhoods in Kolkata
Kolkata Metropolitan Area

bn:ব্রহ্মপুর
bpy:ব্রহ্মাপুর
ne:ब्रह्मपुर
new:ब्रह्मपुर
vi:Brahmapur